Arctostaphylos gabilanensis is a rare species of manzanita known by the common name Gabilan manzanita.

Distribution
It is endemic to California, where it is known only from two disjunct populations in the Gabilan Range on the border between Monterey and San Benito Counties. It was described to science in 2004 from the type specimen collected near Fremont Peak in 2002.

The plant can be found in chaparral habitat. The plant is considered vulnerable because it is rare, with one population containing about 30 individuals and the other spanning about 1000 hectares but widely spaced.

Description
Arctostaphylos gabilanensis is an erect shrub reaching a bushlike one meter to a treelike five meters in height. It is coated in medium or dark red bark, the small twigs with fuzzy hairs.

The waxy gray-green leaves are up to 3.5 centimeters long by 2.4 wide. The blades are oval and auriculate (with an earlobe-shaped lobe on either side of the petiole).

The inflorescence is a panicle of white or pink conical or urn-shaped flowers each 6 to 8 centimeters long. The fruit is a spherical reddish-brown drupe 1 to 1.5 centimeters wide.

References

External links

Calflora Database:  (Gabilan mountains manzanita)
Jepson Manual eFlora (TJM2) treatment of Arctostaphylos gabilanensis
Flora of North America
UC CalPhotos gallery of Arctostaphylos gabilanensis 

gabilanensis
Endemic flora of California
Natural history of the California chaparral and woodlands
Natural history of the California Coast Ranges
Gabilan Range
Natural history of Monterey County, California
Natural history of San Benito County, California
Plants described in 2004
Critically endangered flora of California